India is a union consisting of 28 states and 8 union territories. As of 2022, with an estimated population of 1.4 billion, India is the world's most populous country before the People's Republic of China. India occupies 2.4% of the world's area and is home to 17.5% of the world's population. The Indo-Gangetic Plain has one of the world's biggest stretches of fertile flat-deep alluvium and are among the most densely populated areas of the world. The eastern and western coastal regions of Deccan Plateau are also densely populated regions of India. The Thar Desert in western Rajasthan is one of the most densely populated deserts in the world. The northern and north-eastern states along the Himalayas contain cold arid deserts with fertile valleys. These states have relatively less population density due to indomitable physical barriers.

Census of India

The first population census in British India was conducted in 1872. Since India's independence in 1947, a census has been conducted every 10 years, the first occurring in 1951. The census in India is conducted by the Office of the Registrar General and Census Commissioner under the Ministry of Home Affairs, and is one of the largest administrative tasks conducted by a federal government.

The latest population figures are based on data from the 2011 census of India. During the decade of 2001–2011, India's annual population growth rate has slowed down from 2.15 percent to 1.76 percent. Based on decennial census data, Dadra and Nagar Haveli and Daman and Diu has the fastest growth rate of 55.1 percent, followed by Meghalaya (27.8 percent) and Arunachal Pradesh (25.9 percent). Nagaland recorded the lowest growth rate of -0.5 percent.

India has 641,000 inhabited villages and 72.2 percent of the total population reside in these rural areas. Of them 145,000 villages have population size of 500–999 persons; 130,000 villages have population size of 1000–1999 and 128,000 villages have population size of 200–499. There are 3,961 villages that have a population of 10,000 persons or more. India's 27.8 percent urban population lives in more than 5,100 towns and over 380 urban agglomerations. In the decade of 1991–2001, migration to major cities caused rapid increase in urban population. On the basis of net migrants by last residence during the past decade, Maharashtra had most immigration with 2.3 million, followed by National Capital Territory of Delhi (1.7 million), Gujarat (0.68 million) and Haryana (0.67 million). Uttar Pradesh (−2.6 million) and Bihar (−1.7 million) topped the list for interstate emigration. The five states of Uttar Pradesh, Maharashtra, Bihar, West Bengal and Madhya Pradesh account for almost half (47.90 percent) of the total Indian population.

While the national average for the sex ratio shows an increase from 933 in 2001 to 940 in 2011, the 2011 census shows a sharp decline in the child sex ratio, the number of females per thousand males in a population between age group 0–6 years. States such as Punjab, Haryana, Himachal Pradesh, Gujarat, Tamil Nadu, Mizoram and Andaman and Nicobar Islands recorded an increase in India's child sex ratio. The national child sex ratio has declined from 927 in 2001 to 914 in 2011. Telangana census was separated from Andhra Pradesh state census figures, after Telangana was officially formed on 2 June 2014.

List 
Data from Census 2011 as published by the Registrar General & Census Commissioner, Government of Telangana, and then Planning Commission.

(Population density is rounded to the nearest integer)

Notes

See also 
 List of states in India by past population
 Geography of India
 List of city districts by population density
 List of metropolitan areas in India
 List of states and union territories of India by area

References

External links 
 Official website of Census of India
 Census of India - Density of population
 2011 Indian Census
 Official website of Census of India in 2016
 Official website of Census of India in 2020

India, population
Lists of subdivisions of India